Palisades State Park is a state park of South Dakota, USA, featuring cliffs and rock formations eroded out of pink Sioux Quartzite. At only , it is South Dakota's second-smallest state park.

Natural history
They are exposed on either side of Split Rock Creek, which also flows through Split Rock Creek State Park in Minnesota. Within the quartzite are deposits of catlinite, a softer mineral essential to many Native American groups to make ceremonial pipes. The park lies on the Coteau des Prairies, a plateau on the northern Great Plains.

Cultural history
Pioneers settled in the area beginning in 1865.  In the 1870s Split Rock Creek was harnessed to power a large flour and feed mill, and a town called Palisades formed around it.  Silver was discovered shortly downstream in 1886, prompting a short-lived silver rush but the ore was found to be low quality.  Three years later Garretson became a railroad junction and most of Palisades relocated to the north. A steel truss bridge built over Split Rock Creek in 1908 is on the National Register of Historic Places.

Recreation
Palisades State Park has a campground with 37 sites, 6 camper cabins, and a group tenting area.  There is also a 4-bedroom lodge which can be reserved for private events.  Four hiking trails wind through the park.  Rock climbing is permitted on the quartzite formations, though the use of bolts is prohibited.

References

External links

 Palisades State Park

Climbing areas of the United States
Protected areas of Minnehaha County, South Dakota
State parks of South Dakota